Tajuria caelurea  is a species of lycaenid or blue butterfly found in the Indomalayan realm. It is endemic to Formosa.The larva feeds on Taxillus limprichtii.

References

Tajuria
Butterflies described in 1920